The 2000 Bowling Green Falcons football team was an American football team that represented Bowling Green University in the Mid-American Conference (MAC) during the 2000 NCAA Division I-A football season. In their tenth season under head coach Gary Blackney, the Falcons compiled a 2–9 record (2–6 against MAC opponents), finished in a tie for fifth place in the MAC East Division, and were outscored by all opponents by a combined total of 289 to 174.

The team's statistical leaders included Andy Sahm with 1,490 passing yards, John Gibson with 514 rushing yards, and David Bautista with 915 receiving yards.

Schedule

References

Bowling Green
Bowling Green Falcons football seasons
Bowling Green Falcons football